Fortress Square is a five-storey shopping mall and an entertainment complex located in Lahore Cantonment, Punjab, west of Fortress Cricket Stadium, and south of Hyperstar by Carrefour and Sozo World. The mall is home to over 100 local and international stores, a food court and a cinema. The mall was opened in 2014, and its daily estimated visitors are 30,000 people.

History

In early 2014, Lahore High Court issued a notice to the Fortress Stadium Management to a petition challenging the construction of the mall stating: "(mall) was constructed in violation of the law. The land belongs to the federal government but the Fortress Stadium Management have leased out the land to DUPAK Developers Pakistan on October 27, 2007, for 33 years."

In May 2014, the court was hearing a petition by Nayyer Khan but both the DUPAK Pakistan Developers and Fortress Stadium Management failed to submit their replies regarding the construction site. Petitioner Nayyer Khan later said that the Pakistan Army is the sole owner of the land but the land belongs to the federal government. He also said that the land was specified as Class-AI and was reserved for military purposes.

Attraction
Fortress Square is a five-storey shopping mall and an entertainment complex, with multi-storey car parking. Fortress Square forms part of the larger, Fortress commercial area which also includes, Fortress Cricket Stadium, Hyperstar by Carrefour and Pace Fortress Mall among others.

Brands and stores
The mall is home to over 100 local and international stores.

See also
List of shopping malls in Pakistan
Lucky One Mall
Emporium Mall

References

Shopping malls in Pakistan
Shopping malls in Lahore
Lahore Cantonment
Shopping malls established in 2014
2014 establishments in Pakistan